The national flag of Algeria consists of two equal vertical bars, green and white, charged in the center with a red star and crescent, a symbol of Islam as the nation's prominent faith. The flag was adopted on 3 July 1962. A similar version was used by the Algerian government in exile from 1958 to 1962. The Western blazon is per pale vert and argent; a crescent and star gules.

History

The Barbary pirates of Ottoman Algeria between the 15th and 17th century widely used flags that were emblazoned with one or more crescents. These could however vary greatly in color, with dark red, black, green and white being in use. Besides these, Algerian pirates also used various flags in plain color, such as plain black ones signalling death. Less often, Algerian flags of this time also carried other motifs, such as suns, stars and crossed swords. It is also known that city of Algiers used an orange flag with a white horizontal sword on it by the early 19th century.

While there is some dispute over who exactly designed the green and white with red star and crescent symbol, Émilie Busquant, wife of the Algerian nationalist leader Messali Hadj, is generally credited as having sewed the first version of the flag in 1934.

Historian Benjamin Stora explains that it was during a meeting of the Étoile Nord-Africaine, in 1934, that the colors of the flag were chosen, after which Émilie Busquant was tasked with sewing it. However, René Gallissot and Anissa Bouayed affirm that this is not the first appearance of the Algerian flag, as Algerian trade union demonstrators displayed this same flag (green and white with a red star and crescent) during the May Day parades in 1919 and 1920, in France and Algeria.

Description
Algerian ships fly it as their ensign, except for ships of the Algerian National Navy, which use one charged with two white crossed anchors in the canton as the naval ensign. Formerly, the two crossed anchors in the canton were red.

According to algeria-un.org, cited in 1999, the features of the flag are set down precisely, being described as:

Construction Sheet

Historical flags

See also
Emblem of Algeria

References

Bibliography

External links

Flag of Algeria at flagscorner.com 

 
National symbols of Algeria
Algeria
Algeria
Algeria
Algeria
1962 establishments in Algeria